Wojszyn may refer to the following places in Poland:
Wojszyn, Lublin Voivodeship (east Poland)
Wojszyn, Lower Silesian Voivodeship (south-west Poland)
Wojszyn, Opole Voivodeship (south-west Poland)